US Post Office-Connellsville is a historic post office building located at Connellsville, Fayette County, Pennsylvania.  It was built between 1911 and 1913, and is a two-story, five bay, brick building in the Classical Revival style. It measures 99 feet by 54 feet, with a 10-foot rear extension. It was designed by the Office of the Supervising Architect under the direction of James Knox Taylor.

It was added to the National Register of Historic Places in 1993.

References

Connellsville
Neoclassical architecture in Pennsylvania
Government buildings completed in 1913
Buildings and structures in Fayette County, Pennsylvania
1913 establishments in Pennsylvania
National Register of Historic Places in Fayette County, Pennsylvania